Saint-Édouard-de-Fabre is a parish municipality in western Quebec, Canada, in the Témiscamingue Regional County Municipality.

It is named after Édouard-Charles Fabre.

Demographics 

Population trend:
 Population in 2011: 649 (2006 to 2011 population change: -7.4%)
 Population in 2006: 701
 Population in 2001: 675
 Population in 1996: 734
 Population in 1991: 728

Mother tongue:
 English as first language: 1.4%
 French as first language: 93.6%
 English and French as first language: 0%
 Other as first language: 5.0%

See also
 List of parish municipalities in Quebec

References

Parish municipalities in Quebec
Incorporated places in Abitibi-Témiscamingue
Témiscamingue Regional County Municipality